Liki, also known as Moar, is a nearly extinct Austronesian language spoken on offshore islands of Papua province, Indonesia.

See also
Sarmi languages for a comparison with related languages

References

Languages of western New Guinea
Sarmi–Jayapura languages
Endangered Austronesian languages